Taurus (formerly known as Good News) is a 2022 American drama film directed by Tim Sutton and written by Sutton and Machine Gun Kelly. It was released at the 2022 Berlin Film Festival. On 16 May 2022, it was acquired by RLJE Films for a limited US theatrical release on November 18, 2022.

Cast
 Machine Gun Kelly as Cole
 Maddie Hasson as Ilana
 Scoot McNairy as Ray
 Megan Fox as Mae
 Demetrius Flenory Jr. as Syl
 Naomi Wild as Lena
 Ruby Rose as Bub

Reception
On review aggregator Rotten Tomatoes, the film has an approval rating of 70% calculated based on 10 critics comments. In the Metacritic aggregator, the film has a score of 56 out of 100, indicating "mixed or average reviews".

Writing for The Times, Ed Potton said that "the real-life rock star Machine Gun Kelly is worryingly convincing as an obnoxious fictional rock star in this bleak showbiz parable." David Ehrlich evaluated with B- on IndieWire saying that "at least it's a tale that Baker lived to tell, and refused to let anyone else tell for him." Writing for Deadline, Anna Smith said that "the love-hate relationship between this bickering pair is a darkly funny and touching one that, like many scenes, offers an insight into the lives of the rich and famous".

References

External links 
 

2022 films
2022 drama films
American independent films
2020s English-language films
2022 directorial debut films
Hood films
2020s American films